Charles Lamb (20 November 1900 – 19 March 1989) was a British stage, film and television actor. Previously an engineer, he made his theatre debut in 1924.

His stage work included appearing in the original theatrical production of Brighton Rock at the Garrick Theatre in 1943.

His longest running role was as Mrs Dale's gardener, Monument, in the radio soap opera Mrs Dale's Diary.

Selected filmography

 Once a Crook (1941) - Joseph
 Stop Press Girl (1949) - Green Line Conductor (uncredited)
 The Galloping Major (1951) - Ernie Smart, Horse Owner
 The Lavender Hill Mob (1951) - Mr. Richards (uncredited)
 Appointment with Venus (1951) - Jean - the Cowman
 Curtain Up (1952) - George
 Come Back Peter (1952) - Mr. Hapgood
 Genevieve (1953) - Publican (uncredited)
 The Intruder (1953) - Glazier (uncredited)
 Meet Mr. Lucifer (1953) - 2nd Trap Door Stage Hand (uncredited)
 Impulse (1954) - Mr. Palmer (Car Mechanic) (uncredited)
 Solution by Phone (1954) - (uncredited)
 Delayed Action (1954) - Bank clerk
 Raising a Riot (1955) - Greengrocer (uncredited)
 One Jump Ahead (1955) - Mr. Lamb
 John and Julie (1955) - Man In Train
 The Feminine Touch (1956) - Jenkins
 The Extra Day (1956) - Porter at Flats (uncredited)
 Reach for the Sky (1956) - Walker / Desoutters Aide (uncredited)
 The Tommy Steele Story (1957) - Mr. Steele
 Hell Drivers (1957) - Cafe Owner (uncredited)
 Light Fingers (1957) - (uncredited)
 Lucky Jim (1957) - Contractor
 Davy (1958) - Henry
 The Salvage Gang (1958) - Shorty
 Model for Murder (1959) - Lock Keeper
 Jack the Ripper (1959) - Stage Door Keeper
 The Nun's Story (1959) - Pascin (uncredited)
 The Wreck of the Mary Deare (1959) - Court Clerk (uncredited)
 The Shakedown (1960) - Pinza
 School for Scoundrels (1960) - Carpenter
 The Criminal (1960) - Mr. Able
 The Hands of Orlac (1960) - Guard (uncredited)
 Sword of Sherwood Forest (1960) - Old Bowyer
 The Curse of the Werewolf (1961) - Chef
 Old Mac (1961) - Father
 Design for Loving (1962) - Walter
 Jigsaw (1962) - Mr. Peck (uncredited)
 Hide and Seek (1964) - Porter
 The End of Arthur's Marriage (1965) - Dad
 Life at the Top (1965) - Wincastle
 Charlie Bubbles (1967) - Mr. Noseworthy
 Quatermass and the Pit (1967) - Newsvendor
 Subterfuge (1968) - Caretaker
 The Southern Star (1969) - Todd
 Hands of the Ripper (1971) - Guard
 Universal Soldier (1972) - Taxi Driver (uncredited)
 The Mirror Crack'd (1980) - 2nd Man in Village Hall (uncredited)
 The Tall Guy (1989) - Old Man in Wheelchair (final film role)

References

External links
 

1900 births
1989 deaths
English male stage actors
English male film actors
English male radio actors
English male television actors
20th-century English male actors